The River Blyth flows eastwards through southern Northumberland into the North Sea at the town of Blyth. It flows through Plessey Woods Country Park. The River Pont is a tributary.

The tidal limit of the river is at Bebside.

Ecologists have suggested that a dam on the river at Humford Country Park in Bedlington could be removed to allow for fish migration. The local community have expressed a desire to keep the dam as it is a local beauty spot; they have suggested that a fish passage be built alongside instead.

References

External links

Bridges On the Blyth

Blyth